Vahid Ahmadov (born 1947, Qonaqkənd, Quba Rayon, Azerbaijan) is a Member of the National Assembly of Azerbaijan and Deputy chairman of Azerbaijani National Assembly's Committee on Economic Policy.

Life
Born in the village of Qonaqkənd of Quba Rayon, April 2, 1947.

On November 6, 2005 he was elected as Member of Parliament from Quba constituency No. 52. In the parliament, he is a deputy chair of the Standing Commission of the Milli Mejlis on Economic Policy; head of Azerbaijan-Germany, Azerbaijan-Croatia, Azerbaijan-Russia and Azerbaijan-Turkmenistan working groups on interparliamentary relations.

Vahid Ahmadov is married, with two children.

References

External links
Vahid Əhmədovdan xəbər var. modern.az

1947 births
Members of the National Assembly (Azerbaijan)
Living people
People from Quba
Azerbaijan Technical University alumni